Alena Horalová (born 24 November 1952) is a Czech handball player, born in Plzeň. 

She played for the Czechoslovak national team, and represented Czechoslovakia at the 1980 Summer Olympics in Moscow.

References

External links

1952 births
Living people
Sportspeople from Plzeň
Czechoslovak female handball players
Olympic handball players of Czechoslovakia 
Handball players at the 1980 Summer Olympics